Blackfriars Friary was a medieval Dominican friary dating back to the thirteenth century. The remains of the friary, located in Hereford, England, consist of monastery ruins, a cemetery, and a stone preaching cross. The ruins are surrounded by a rose garden established by the local community in 1964.

Description
The site includes the  remains of a Dominican refectory, prior's house, part of the original cloister walls, a stone preaching cross, and a cemetery.

History 
The Friary of the Dominican Order of Blackfriars, also known as the Blackfriars Friary, was founded sometime before 1246. Multiple parcels of land were granted to the Blackfriars by John Daniel, Bishop Orleton and Edward II.  Edward III was reported to be present at the dedication of the church. The friary, located in the parish of St. John, Hereford, was established in 1322 when a chapel and monastic buildings were built. A stone preaching cross and cemetery were added later.   
 
The friary was demolished in 1538 during the Dissolution of the Monasteries. What remained after 1538 were the buildings in the monastery's west range and the fourteenth century Preaching Cross. The monastic land was purchased by John Scudamore (died 1571), and later acquired by Thomas Coningsby. Coningsby combined some of the remaining buildings  with the nearby buildings of the Order of St John to create the Coningsby Hospital.  

The site was excavated in 1958, and the findings established the location of the cloister walls and the nave of the church. It also established that the friary consisted of a gatehouse, a variety of domestic buildings and separate apartments, adjacent to gardens and orchards. The cemetery is located to the west of the friary and includes a 14th century stone preaching cross, which was restored in 1864.

Blackfriars rose garden
The first garden beds in the Rose Gardens were planted in March 1964, a gift to the City of Hereford from the Hereford and the West of England Rose Society to mark its centenary. Over the years, a total of 28 rose beds were planted.  The rose gardens are being revived in a five-year programme of replanting and tending by volunteers from the community – the Friends of Blackfriars Rose Gardens.

References

Monasteries in Herefordshire
Hereford